Small Mercies is the second album by Norwegian group Fra Lippo Lippi and the first to feature new lead vocalist Per Øystein Sørensen. In contrast to the new wave sound of the band's debut album In Silence, the addition of Sørensen gave Small Mercies and the band's further recordings a more pop-oriented feel.

"Everytime I See You", a song released by the band in 1986 from their album Songs, is a reworking of the song "A Small Mercy".

This album (sans the song "Some Things Never Change") and In Silence were re-released by Rune Arkiv in 2003 as the compilation album The Early Years.

Track listing

 "Some Things Never Change"
 "A Small Mercy"
 "Barrier"
 "Sense of Doubt"
 "The Treasure"
 "Slow Sway"
 "Now and Forever"
 "French Painter Dead"

Personnel
Rune Kristoffersen - Keyboards, guitar, bass
Per Øystein Sørensen - Vocals
Morten Sjøberg - Drums

References

Fra Lippo Lippi (band) albums
1983 albums